Lianyuan (1838–11 August 1900) was a Manchu Chinese statesman in the late Qing dynasty of China. His courtesy name was Xianheng (仙蘅). Lianyuan came from the Cuigiya clan of Haixi Jurchens. He also belonged to the Bordered Red Banner (Kubuhe fulgiyan Gūsa) under the Eight Banners system. He was best known for his role during the Boxer Rebellion and his execution afterward for his views about how to pacify the internal and external chaos caused by the rebellion.

Career 
Lianyuan obtained his Jinshi title by passing the imperial exams in 1868. He was then elected a Shujishi, a temporary position held by elites among the Jinshi rank. His first official appointment as an officer was in the Anqing Fu. He mainly administered the internal affairs of Anhui Province before being summoned to the capital in 1899. Lianyuan was appointed as a supernumerary official of Zongli Yamen, the "de facto" foreign ministry of China during the late Qing dynasty. Soon after, he was promoted to the Grand Secretariat where he acted as a grand secretary, a position that paralleled the Ottoman grand vizier.

After the Boxer Rebellion's outbreak, xenophobic rebels attacked the embassies of many European countries. At that point in time, some Chinese government officials could not resist the temptation to expel westerners by the means of this very rebellion. The rebellion was largely against the European powers and consequently drew the sympathy of numerous government officials. During an imperial conference, Xu Tong and Chongyi, both sympathetic to the Boxer rebels, claimed, "The sentiment of the people can be used." This claim was met by opposition from Lianyuan. He insisted that "The sentiment of the people can be used, but the sentiment of criminals cannot be used."

In 1900, the Eight-Nation Alliance forcefully occupied the port of Dagu. The siege of Beijing and its fall marked the failure of the sympathizing policy about the Boxer rebellion. However, ultraconservative members among the Chinese officials tried to initiate a total resistance by moving the capital to the western city of Xi'an. Prince Zaiyi of the royal house of Aisin-gioro firmly held his aggression against the invading European alliance. Lianyuan found the prince's idea to be quite dangerous, and he retorted that China could not possibly win the war against the eight-country alliance, seeing that China already lost the First Sino-Japanese War to Japan, a single modernized power. The prince was angered by this retort and executed Lianyuan along with other officials who shared similar opinions. His execution took place on August 11, 1900.

On September 7, 1901, the Boxer Protocol was signed between China and the Eight-Nation Alliance. China agreed to put the rebellion to rest and compensate the invading forces for their losses. Among the protocols, five Chinese officials were mentioned for their consistent opposition to the violent solution. The protocol demanded that they be rewarded. Accordingly, Lianyuan was then posthumously exonerated.

1838 births
1900 deaths
Manchu politicians
Qing dynasty politicians
Chinese people of the Boxer Rebellion
Ministers of Zongli Yamen
Executed Qing dynasty people